TOI-4138b is a transiting exoplanet orbiting the G-type subgiant TOI-4138 1,674 light years away in the northern circumpolar constellation Ursa Minor.

Discovery
The planet was recently discovered by TESS using the Transit, which involves measuring light curves during a planet’s eclipse. The paper states that it’s inflated due to heating from its host, which has a high luminosity.  Its discovery was announced in October of 2021.

Properties

Orbit and mass
TOI-4138b has an orbital period of 3.6 days, typical for a hot Jupiter. This corresponds to a separation from its host close to one eighth of the distance of Mercury from the Sun. Since the inclination is known, doppler spectroscopy measurements give the planet a mass only 67% that of Jupiter.

Characteristics
TOI-4138b’s transit gives it a radius 149% that of Jupiter; this combined with its low mass gives it a density only 25% that of water. Its separation is comparable with HD 209458 b, but is much larger due to the evolved state of the host star.

References 

Exoplanets discovered in 2021
Hot Jupiters
Ursa Minor (constellation)
Transiting exoplanets